Olakettiambalam is a small village situated in the southern part of Alappuzha district, six kilometers south of Mavelikkara and six kilometers from Kayamkulam at latitude 9.27426 north and longitude 76.5061 east.  It is famous for temples and it was named after that. This place belongs to Onattukara.

Demography 

In the 2006 census, Olakettiambalam had a population of 1770, of which male constitutes 48% and female constitutes 52%. Olakettiambalam has a literacy of 94%.

Politics 

Olakettiambalam is a part of Mavelikara (Lok sabha constituency).

Temples
 Koipallikarazhma Devi temple
 Vathikulangara Devi temple
 Eduvadikavu Devi temple
 Cheruvalli Bagavathi temple
 Chettikulangara Devi Temple
 Kulathazhathu Murthi temple

Churches
 St. Paul's Marthoma Church, Vathikulam, Olakettiambalam
 St. Mary's Orthodox Church, Olaketty
 St. Thomas' Marthoma Church, Pallickal
 St. Gregorius Orthodox Church, Mullikulangara   
 Assemblies of God Churches in Olaketti, Vathikulam, and Olakettiambalam

Schools 
 St John's L.P.S., Vathikulam
 Thekkekara govt. UP School, Koipallikarazhma
 Holy Trinity Central Senior Secondary School
 Koypallikarazhma High School
 Vignjaana Santhaayani Sanskrit High School
 C.M.S. L.P.S. Pallickal
 Pallickal Naduvilemuri LPS
 Pope Pius XI Higher Secondary School, Kattanam

Post office

Olakettiampalam Post Office Pin code 690510

Public library 
Olakettiambalam has a public library which has been running for the last 49 years. The new building was inaugurated by the minister V. M. Sudheeran.

Nearby villages 
Olakettiambalam, Kurthicad, Mullikulangra, Bharanikavu, peringala etc.

Sources 
Mavelikara website.
Mavelikara diocese

References

Villages in Alappuzha district